Ivan Ronald Hollett (22 April 1940 – 23 March 2022) was an English footballer.

Career
He played as a striker for five Football League clubs.

He then had a spell as player-coach at Durban United before taking on similar roles at several non-league clubs, including Alfreton Town where he scored 47 goals in 86 appearances, and whom he also guided to the 1976-77 Midland League championship.

Hollett later worked for Mansfield Town as a scout and was youth team coach at Field Mill. On 27 June 2009, it was announced that he would take up a role of watching youngsters out on loan and report back to manager David Holdsworth.

Death
Hollett died on 23 March 2022, at the age of 81.

References

1940 births
2022 deaths
People from Pinxton
Footballers from Derbyshire
English footballers
Association football forwards
English Football League players
Derby County F.C. players
Mansfield Town F.C. players
Chesterfield F.C. players
Crewe Alexandra F.C. players
Cambridge United F.C. players
Hereford United F.C. players
Sutton Town A.F.C. players